Fancy was a 46-gun frigate commanded by pirate Henry Every between May 1694 to late 1695.

History

Fancy was initially a 46-gun privateer named Charles II  – after Charles II of Spain – in Spanish service, commanded by a Captain Gibson, and was anchored at A Coruña, Spain. On 7 May 1694, Henry Every and a few other conspirators organised and carried out a successful mutiny and, setting Captain Gibson ashore, left A Coruña for the Cape of Good Hope. At this time, Charles II was renamed Fancy.

Upon arriving at the Cape, Every sailed to the island of Johanna (Anjouan) in the Comoros Islands, where he had Fancy careened, removing barnacles and weed from the section of the hull that was permanently below water, increasing her speed. He also had Fancy razeed, intentionally removing parts of the ship's superstructure in order to increase her speed. Following this work, Fancy became one of the fastest ships active in the Indian Ocean, and Every used this speed to attack and take a French pirate ship, looting the vessel and recruiting approximately 40 of the crew to his own ship, leaving him with a total complement of around 150.

Every continued to be active in the Indian Ocean, where he worked alongside other famous pirates of his time, including Thomas Tew. Most notable in his captures was Ganj-i-Sawai, a Mughal ship under the command of Ibrahim Khan during Emperor Aurangzeb's era. Since Ganj-I-Sawai mounted 62 cannons and had four to five hundred musket-armed guards, cannon fire from Fancy was instrumental in Every's victory – the first salvo caused a cannon aboard Ganj-I-Siwai to explode, killing a number of gunners. Every's career ended when the crew returned to Nassau in April 1696, in the Bahamas. He returned to Britain aboard the sloop Sea Flower, arriving in Ireland in June 1696 and promptly disappearing.

Although the fate of Fancy is unknown, it was rumored that Every gave her to the governor of Nassau as a bribe. There is supporting documentary evidence that Fancy ran aground on New Providence and Governor Trott had the guns and everything of value stripped.

References

Sources
 FOX, E.T., King of the Pirates: The Swashbuckling Life of Henry Every, The History press, Stroud, Glos. 2008,

Further reading

 BAER, Joel H. Pirates of the British Isles, Tempus Publishing, London 2005
 HANNA, Mark G., Pirate Nests and the Rise of the British Empire, 1570–1740, University of North Carolina Press 2015
 PRESTON, Diana & Michael, A Pirate of Exquisite Mind –The Life of William Dampier, Corgi Books 2005
 PRINGLE, Patrick, Jolly Rodger, The Story of the Great Age of Piracy, Dover Publications Inc., New York 2001

Age of Sail ships of England
Pirate ships
Privateer ships
1690s ships
Charles II of Spain